Canoeiro may refer to:

Avá-Canoeiro language 
Rikbaktsa language